The Drôme, a river in southeastern France, a left tributary of the Rhône. Its source is in the western foothills of the Alps, near the village Valdrôme. It flows into the Rhône near Loriol-sur-Drôme, between Valence and Montélimar. Tributaries of the Drôme include the Bez (or Bès), the Roanne and the Gervanne.

The Drôme flows through the following départements and towns:
 Drôme (named after the river): Valdrôme, Luc-en-Diois, Die, Saillans, Allex, Crest, Loriol-sur-Drôme, Livron-sur-Drôme
 Ardèche : Le Pouzin

References

Drome
Rivers of Drôme
Rivers of Auvergne-Rhône-Alpes